New Humanism was a term applied to a theory of literary criticism, together with its consequences for culture and political thought, developed around 1900 by the American scholar Irving Babbitt and the American literary critic and essayist Paul Elmer More. Babbitt's book Literature and the American College (1908) first gave it a definite form; it was aimed at a perceived gap between the ideals of liberal arts colleges, and university education as it actually existed. 

Babbitt himself did not accept the qualification new as applied to his humanism, which became influential as a strand of conservative thought in the following years, up to the 1930s. Other authors associated with the New Humanist group included George Roy Elliott (1883–1963), Norman Foerster (1887–1972) and Stuart Pratt Sherman (1881–1926). Numerous attacks came from outside, especially during the 1920s.

This group was also at times known as The Nation criticism, from More's time editing The Nation from 1909. The adoption by Seward Collins of its philosophy, or some trappings, in his publication The Bookman did something to tarnish it, in a way that external critics had up until then failed to do. Some of the members renounced the approach.

References 

Humanism and America: Essays on the Outlook of Modern Civilisation (1930) edited by Norman Foerster
The New Humanism: A Critique of Modern America, 1900–1940 (1977) J. David Hoeveler, Jr.

External links 
"Irving Babbitt", in The Columbia Encyclopedia, Sixth Edition

Literary criticism